Shimojima Station (下島駅) is the name of two train stations in Japan:

Shimojima Station (Ina, Nagano)
 Shimojima Station (Matsumoto, Nagano)